Rissoa olangoensis is a species of sea snail, a marine gastropod mollusc in the family Rissoidae.

Description
The length of the shell attains 2.2 mm.

Distribution
This marine species occurs off the Philippines.

Original description
 Poppe G.T., Tagaro S.P. & Stahlschmidt P. (2015). New shelled molluscan species from the central Philippines I. Visaya. 4(3): 15-59. page(s): 24, pl. 8 figs 1-3.

References

External links
 Worms Link

Rissoidae